Alihodžić is a surname, derived from Turkish Ali Hoca. Notable people with the surname include:

Emir Alihodžić (born 1993), Bosnian footballer
 (born 1969), Bosnian and Yugoslav basketball player
Fahro Alihodžić (born 1989), Bosnian-British basketball player
Haris Alihodžić (born 1968), Bosnian footballer

Bosnian surnames